The Teachers' Pension Scheme is a guaranteed income pension for teachers in England and Wales. It gives a defined benefit to people upon reaching retirement age, for each year until death, depending on how many years the teacher has paid in.

In Scotland, teachers access the Scottish Teachers’ Pension Scheme, or the Scottish Teachers Superannuation Scheme.

2022 dispute
In 2022, private school teachers in 23 schools in England and Wales under the Girls’ Day School Trust went on strike over the threat to close the scheme to new entrants. The previous year, the government had raised required contributions of school employers by 43%, but while free-state schools were covered, fee-charging private schools were not. The private schools instead argued they should cut teachers' pensions by around 20%, prompting the industrial action. In response parents groups organised to witthold fees from the schools when their children did not receive school.

See also
Universities Superannuation Scheme
UK enterprise law
UK labour law
NASUWT
National Education Union

Notes

Pensions